Attics to Eden is the second studio album by American band Madina Lake. It was released on 1 May 2009 in Australia, 4 May in the UK and 5 May 2009 in the United States. The track listing was announced in January 2009 by the British music magazine, Kerrang.

Musically, it is much different from the band's debut album From Them, Through Us, to You. The booklet folds out to a map showing Madina Lake's fictional character, Adalia's, journey to Eden.

The album debuted and peaked at #44 on the UK Albums Chart.

Track listing

Digital bonus tracks

Japan bonus track

Personnel
 Nathan Leone – lead vocals
 Mateo Camargo – guitar, keyboards, synthesizers, programming, backing vocals
 Matthew Leone – bass guitar, backing vocals
 Dan Torelli – drums, percussion

Release history

"Never Take Us Alive"
The first single "Never Take Us Alive" is available on iTunes as well as other digital music retailers. Frontman Nathan Leone explained to Kerrang! that "Never Take Us Alive" is about, "overcoming the negativity, ignoring it and continuing the pursuit of your own happiness."
The video was first aired on the online MySpaceTV, and has since found its way to YouTube.
This song is included in the soundtrack of the game Colin McRae: Dirt 2.

"Welcome to Oblivion"
Their third single off the album is "Welcome to Oblivion", as announced in their blog on their website. The video was shot the weekend of September 11, 2009 and has been released in the UK prior to being released in the United States.

References

2009 albums
Madina Lake albums
Roadrunner Records albums
Albums produced by David Bendeth
Concept albums